Zermatten is a surname. Notable people with the surname include:

Christian Zermatten (born 1966), Swiss football manager
Cristian Zermatten, Argentine footballer
Jean Zermatten (born 1948), activist, son of Maurice
Maurice Zermatten (1910–2001), Swiss writer
Walter Zermatten (born 1971), Argentine footballer